Podnizhny is a rural locality (a khutor) in Kletskoye Rural Settlement, Kletsky District, Volgograd Oblast, Russia. The population was 264 as of 2010. There are 3 streets.

Geography 
Podnizhny is located on the Don River, 2 km northwest of Kletskaya (the district's administrative centre) by road. Karazhensky is the nearest rural locality.

References 

Rural localities in Kletsky District